The Roman Catholic Archdiocese of Raipur is an archdiocese located in the city of Raipur in India.

History
 16 January 1964: Established as the Apostolic Prefecture of Raipur from the Metropolitan Archdiocese of Nagpur
 5 July 1973: Promoted as Diocese of Raipur
 27 February 2004: Promoted as Metropolitan Archdiocese of Raipur

Leadership
 Archbishops of Raipur (Latin Rite)
 Archbishop-elect Victor Henry Thakur (3 July 2013 – present); formerly, Bishop of the Roman Catholic Diocese of Bettiah, in Bettiah, India
 Archbishop Joseph Augustine Charanakunnel (27 February 2004 – 3 July 2013); retired
 Bishops of Raipur (Latin Rite) 
 Bishop Joseph Augustine Charanakunnel (later Archbishop) (21 November 1992 – 27 February 2004)
 Bishop Philip Ekka, S.J. (20 October 1984 – 15 February 1991)
 Prefects Apostolic of Raipur (Latin Rite) 
 Fr. John A. Weidner, S.A.C. (17 January 1964 – 1973)

Suffragan dioceses
 Ambikapur 
 Jagdalpur
 Jashpur
 Raigarh

References

External links
 GCatholic.org 
 Catholic Hierarchy 

Roman Catholic dioceses in India
Christian organizations established in 1964
Roman Catholic dioceses and prelatures established in the 20th century
Christianity in Chhattisgarh
1964 establishments in Madhya Pradesh
Raipur, Chhattisgarh